The Robert Stout Law Library is the law library of the University of Otago in the city of Dunedin in New Zealand. It is named in honour of Sir Robert Stout, the first lecturer in law at Otago (1873-1876). Following his time at Otago, Stout went on to serve as Attorney-General, Premier, and Chief Justice of New Zealand.

The Law Library is currently located in the Richardson Building in Otago's main campus in Dunedin. It occupies four floors of the Richardson Building, with 275 reader spaces.  In the 1970s the library moved to the Richardson Building from the adjacent historic building which now houses the university's Staff Club.

The Law Library currently houses over 66,000 volumes of legal material, including primary sources from New Zealand, Australia, the United Kingdom, Canada. It also subscribes to the major legal journals and databases.

External links
Official website
Robert Stout biography, Te Ara

Libraries in Dunedin
Academic libraries in New Zealand
Archives in New Zealand
Law libraries
Buildings and structures of the University of Otago